Karian (also Romanized as Karīān, Kareyān, and Karīyan; also known as Kariūn) is a village in Karian Rural District, in the Central District of Minab County, Hormozgan Province, Iran. At the 2006 census, its population was 4,340, in 818 families.

References 

Populated places in Minab County